Deildartunguhver is a hot spring in Reykholtsdalur, Iceland. It is characterized by a very high flow rate for a hot spring (180 liters/second) and water emerges at 97 °C. It is the highest-flow hot spring in Europe.

Some of the water is used for heating, being piped 34 kilometers to Borgarnes and 64 kilometers to Akranes. 

A fern called Struthiopteris fallax, grows in Deildartunguhver. This fern is the only endemic fern in Iceland, and it does not grow anywhere else in the world.

References

External links
 Icelandic website describing Deildartunguhver

Hot springs of Iceland
Borgarbyggð